Xipheroceras  is a Lower Jurassic ammonite belonging to the Eoderoceratidae, and sometimes placed in the subfamily Xipheroceratinae for which it is the namesake. It has been found in the upper Sinemurian (about mid L Jurassic) of Europe and possibly Borneo.

Xipheroceras, named by Buckman, 1911, has an evolute shell, all whorls clearly exposed, only very slightly impressed dorsally (on the inside curvature).  Inner and middle whorls have strong ribs with large spines at the outer ends. Outer whorls have closer simpler ribs.

References

Arkell, et al., 1957. Mesozoic Ammonoidea, in Treatise on Invertebrate Paleontology, (Part L); Geological Soc. of America and University of Kansas press. 
Donovan, D.T. Callomon and Howarth 1981 Classification of the Jurassic Ammonitina; Systematics Association. 

Early Jurassic ammonites of Europe
Ammonites of Europe
Sinemurian life
Eoderoceratoidea